Entertainment Building is an office building in Central, Hong Kong Island, Hong Kong. The neo-gothic architecture and height of the building make it distinctive amongst the office buildings nearby. It faces the Aon China Building and overviews Pedder Street.

History

Completed in 1846, the first building on the site was the first generation of the Hong Kong Club. After the club moved to its current location at 1 Jackson Road in 1897, the building turned into commercial use, the largest tenant was Yee Sang Fat.

In 1928, the building, along with the Coronet Theatre at its back, were demolished to make way for the construction of the air-conditioned King's Theatre (娛樂戲院). It featured a ballroom as well as a restaurant. The theatre opened to business on 31 March 1931 with Ernst Lubitsch's Monte Carlo.

The theatre closed on 1 September 1962 with a Walt Disney film and was replaced by the second generation of King's Theatre. The rebuilt King's Theatre opened to business on 21 December 1964. It had 1,302 seats. The theatre was in turn closed on 1 January 1990 and was rebuilt into the present building.

Ownership
In November 1996, Hysan Development Holdings agreed to buy the building from Chinese Estates Holdings, for $3.64 billion, an average price of about $17,300 per sq ft.

In 2005, Hysan announced that it would sell the building for $2.7 billion.

See also
List of tallest buildings in Hong Kong

References

External links
 
 
 Photoset showing the various buildings at this location over time

1993 establishments in Hong Kong
Central, Hong Kong
Office buildings completed in 1993
Skyscraper office buildings in Hong Kong